Woodsia plummerae is a species of fern known by the common name Plummer's cliff fern. It is native to the southwestern United States and northern Mexico, where it grows in rocky habitat in deserts and other areas. It has leaves up to 25 centimeters long with flexible reddish or purplish rachises covered in glandular hairs. The blade is made up of several pairs of leaflets which are subdivided into multilobed or toothed small segments.

The species is named in honor of American botanist Sarah Plummer Lemmon.

References

External links
Photo gallery

plummerae
Flora of the Southwestern United States
Flora of Northwestern Mexico
Plants described in 1882